Two ships in the United States Navy have been named USS Hatteras for Hatteras Island or Hatteras Inlet on the coast of North Carolina, and a third ship that was cancelled prior to construction was also to have borne the name:

 , a steamer purchased in 1861, which served during the American Civil War and was sunk by CSS Alabama in January 1863
 , purchased in 1917, served as a cargo ship during World War I, and decommissioned in 1919
 , a Barnegat-class small seaplane tender that was canceled in 1943, prior to construction

United States Navy ship names